Chas Kane McCormick (born April 19, 1995) is an American professional baseball outfielder for the Houston Astros of Major League Baseball (MLB).  McCormick attended Millersville University of Pennsylvania and played college baseball for the Marauders.  Drafted by the Astros in the 21st round of the 2017 MLB draft, he made his MLB debut in 2021.

Early life
McCormick was born in West Chester, Pennsylvania, to Robert and Nancy Jo McCormick. At Henderson High School (West Chester High School), he was four-time All-Ches-Mont League, and became the first player in school history to score 1,000 career points in basketball and record 100 career hits in baseball.

College
He attended Millersville University of Pennsylvania, an NCAA Division II school, and played baseball for the Millersville Marauders. McCormick set Millersville career records in hits, runs, RBIs, and triples, became the Pennsylvania State Athletic Conference's all-time hits leader, was named an All-PSAC East player four times, was named the PSAC East Athlete of the Year, and was named an All-American.

Professional career

2017-21
The Houston Astros selected McCormick in the 21st round of the draft in 2017. He signed with a bonus of $1,000. In 2019, he was named an MiLB.com Houston Organization All Star. Through 2019, his minor league performance in 1,126 plate appearances had him batting .276/.360/.400 with 20 home runs and 41 steals (in 53 attempts).

McCormick made the Astros' wild card playoff roster in 2020. However, he did not make an appearance in the playoffs and was left off the playoff roster after a sweep of the Minnesota Twins.

On April 1, 2021, McCormick made his MLB debut against the Oakland Athletics as a defensive replacement for Michael Brantley. He hit his first home run on April 4 against Yusmeiro Petit. In 2021, he batted .257/.319/.447 with 14 home runs and 50 RBIs in 284 at bats.

2022
McCormick made the Astros' 2022 Opening Day roster. On May 6, he hit a two-run home run in the second inning versus the Detroit Tigers, the go-ahead run in a 3–2 Astros win.  His double leading off the seventh inning on May 29 ended a perfect game bid by Texas Rangers' starter Martín Pérez. McCormick then scored the Astros' first run on a Yordan Álvarez single as the Astros won, 3–2.  McCormick collected three hits versus the A's on May 31 to end a 2-for-23 slump, capped by a tie-breaking home run in the eighth inning versus Frankie Montas that resulted in a 3–1 Astros win.  McCormick also hit an RBI single in the fifth inning.

On June 26, McCormick was optioned to the AAA Sugar Land Space Cowboys, but was recalled two days later to replace an injured Michael Brantley. McCormick drove in five runs versus the Chicago White Sox on August 18, hitting a home run in a 21–5 win, tied for second-highest scoring output in team history. On September 9, he hit a home run and drove in three runs versus the Los Angeles Angels to lead the Astros to a 4–3 win.

In the 2022 regular season, he batted .245/.332/.407 in 359 at bats, with 14 home runs and 44 RBIs. He played 64 games in left field, 60 in center field, and 17 in right field.

In Game 1 of the 2022 American League Championship Series (ALCS) versus the New York Yankees, McCormick hit a home run off Clarke Schmidt for the first of his career in the postseason. McCormick would also hit a go-ahead 2-run home run off of Gerrit Cole in Game 3 of the ALCS en route to an Astros sweep.

In the ninth inning of Game 5 of the World Series, McCormick's catch of a J. T. Realmuto fly ball at the wall at Citizens Bank Park in Philadelphia helped preserve a 3–2 lead for an eventual Astros win.  After colliding with the fence, his landing left a starfish-shaped imprint on the warning track dirt on which the outline of his jersey number 20 was visible. The Astros defeated the Phillies the following game for their fourth win in the best-of-seven to give McCormick his first career World Series title.

References

External links

Living people
1995 births
People from West Chester, Pennsylvania
Baseball players from Pennsylvania
Major League Baseball outfielders
Houston Astros players
Millersville Marauders baseball players
Buies Creek Astros players
Quad Cities River Bandits players
Greeneville Astros players
Corpus Christi Hooks players
Round Rock Express players
Leones del Escogido players
American expatriate baseball players in the Dominican Republic